James Hayden Tufts (1862–1942), an influential American philosopher, was a professor of the then newly founded Chicago University.  Tufts was also a member of the Board of Arbitration, and the chairman of a committee of the social agencies of Chicago. The work Ethics in 1908 (with a second edition appearing in 1932) was a collaboration of Tufts and John Dewey. Tufts believed in a conception of mutual influences which he saw as opposed in both Marxism and idealism.

Tufts was an 1884 graduate of Amherst College; received a B.D. from Yale University in 1889 (where he won the John Addison Porter Prize), an M.A. from Amherst College in 1890, and his Ph.D. from the University of Freiburg under Alois Riehl in 1892. With John Dewey and George Herbert Mead (both of whom Tufts was instrumental in bringing to the University), Tufts was a co-founder of the Chicago School of Pragmatism. Tufts was a longstanding chairman of the Department of Philosophy and at one time was the acting president of Chicago University.

Selected works
America's Social Morality (1933)

External links
James H. Tufts Papers, 1782-1942 at Southern Illinois University Carbondale, Special Collections Research Center
 
 James Hayden Tufts (AC 1884) Papers at the Amherst College Archives & Special Collections
 
Guide to the James Hayden Tufts Papers 1908-1942 at the University of Chicago Special Collections Research Center

1862 births
1942 deaths
20th-century American philosophers
Amherst College alumni
Yale University alumni
University of Freiburg alumni
American expatriates in Germany